Occidentalist may refer to:
 Supporter of the international auxiliary language Occidental, also called Interlingue
 Someone or something related to Occidentalism

See also
 Orientalist (disambiguation)